Oddur Sigurðsson (born 28 April 1959) is an Icelandic sprinter. He competed in the 400 metres at the 1980 Summer Olympics and the 1984 Summer Olympics. He raced in heat 7 and came 7th out of 7 runners with a time of 10.94 seconds. He did not advance to the next round.

References

1959 births
Living people
Athletes (track and field) at the 1980 Summer Olympics
Athletes (track and field) at the 1984 Summer Olympics
Oddur Sigurdsson
Oddur Sigurdsson
Place of birth missing (living people)